Mandela is a musical based on the life of Nelson Mandela, with music and lyrics by Greg Dean Borowsky and Shaun Borowsky, and a book by Laiona Michelle.

Productions 
Mandela began previews at the Young Vic Theatre, London on 30 November 2022, with an opening night on 8 December. It played a limited run to February 4, 2023. A large number of performances were cancelled due to unprecedented levels of illness. Cast member Adam Pearce suffered a stroke following a performance, which attracted wide-spread coverage of a fundraiser to aide his recovery.

Cast and characters

References

External links
Official site

2022 musicals
Biographical musicals
British musicals
Cultural depictions of Nelson Mandela
Cultural depictions of Winnie Mandela
Plays set in South Africa
Plays about apartheid